Below is a list of Morangos com Açúcar cast members:

Television in Portugal